Gil Kalai (born 1955) is the Henry and Manya Noskwith Professor Emeritus of Mathematics at the Hebrew University of Jerusalem, Israel, Professor of Computer Science at the Interdisciplinary Center, Herzliya, and adjunct Professor of mathematics and of computer science at Yale University, United States.

Biography
Kalai received his PhD from Hebrew University in 1983, under the supervision of Micha Perles, and joined the Hebrew University faculty in 1985 after a postdoctoral fellowship at the Massachusetts Institute of Technology. He was the recipient of the Pólya Prize in 1992, the Erdős Prize of the Israel Mathematical Society in 1993, and the Fulkerson Prize in 1994. He is known for finding variants of the simplex algorithm in linear programming that can be proven to run in subexponential time, for showing that every monotone property of graphs has a sharp phase transition, for solving Borsuk's problem (known as Borsuk's conjecture) on the number of pieces needed to partition convex sets into subsets of smaller diameter, and for his work on the Hirsch conjecture on the diameter of convex polytopes and in polyhedral combinatorics more generally.

From 1995 to 2001, he was the Editor-in-Chief of the Israel Journal of Mathematics. In 2016, he was elected honorary member of the Hungarian Academy of Sciences. In 2018 he was a plenary speaker with talk Noise Stability, Noise Sensitivity and the Quantum Computer Puzzle at the International Congress of Mathematicians in Rio de Janeiro.

Kalai's conjectures on quantum computing

Kalai is a quantum computing skeptic who argues that true (classically unattainable) quantum computing will not be achieved because the necessary quality of quantum error correction cannot be reached.

Conjecture 1 (No quantum error correction). The process for creating a quantum error-correcting code will necessarily lead to a mixture of the desired codewords with undesired codewords. The probability of the undesired codewords is uniformly bounded away from zero. (In every implementation of quantum error-correcting codes with one encoded qubit, the probability of not getting the intended qubit is at least some δ > 0, independently of the number of qubits used for encoding.)

Conjecture 2. A noisy quantum computer is subject to noise in which information leaks for two substantially entangled qubits have a substantial positive correlation.

Conjecture 3. In any quantum computer at a highly entangled state there will be a strong effect of error-synchronization.

Conjecture 4. Noisy quantum processes are subject to detrimental noise.

Recognition
Kalai was the winner of the 2012 Rothschild Prize in mathematics.  He was named to the 2023 class of Fellows of the American Mathematical Society, "for contributions to combinatorics, convexity, and their applications, as well as to the exposition and communication of mathematics".

See also
Kalai's 3d conjecture
Entropy influence conjecture

References

External links

 Kalai's home page at Hebrew University
 Combinatorics and more, Kalai's blog
  (Plenary Lecture 19)

1955 births
Living people
Combinatorialists
Einstein Institute of Mathematics alumni
Academic staff of the Hebrew University of Jerusalem
Yale University faculty
Science bloggers
20th-century Israeli mathematicians
21st-century Israeli  mathematicians
Fellows of the American Mathematical Society
Erdős Prize recipients